The 2022 Indoor Football League season was the fourteenth (and thirteenth complete) season of the Indoor Football League (IFL).  The league played the season with 14 teams, up from 11 teams the previous season. The Bay Area Panthers, Quad City Steamwheelers, and San Diego Strike Force, returned from dormancy after electing not to play during the 2021 season due to the COVID-19 pandemic. The Vegas Knight Hawks joined the league as an expansion team. The Cedar Rapids River Kings did not return and the announced 2022 expansion Columbus Wild Dogs pushed back their start date to 2023. The Spokane Shock were removed from the league in February 2022 after the team lost its lease for their home arena.

In the national championship round the Northern Arizona Wranglers won their first title by defeating the Quad City Steamwheelers.  In doing so the Wranglers completed a worst to first comeback having won only one game the previous season.

Teams
For the 2022 season, the league is split into two conferences.

The playoffs will have the top four teams per conference qualifying, and will be seeded first through fourth.

Regular season

Standings

Eastern Conference

Western Conference

 y – Clinched division
 x – Clinched playoff spot
 e – Eliminated from playoff contention

Playoffs

References

See also 
2022 National Arena League season

Indoor Football League seasons
Indoor Football League season